Callum Ebanks (born 8 October 2002) is an English professional footballer who plays as a forward for  club Cheltenham Town.

Career
Ebanks started playing football at the age of twelve and earned trials with Walsall and Birmingham City after joining Oldbury-based Sunday side Legion Lions. He joined Cheltenham Town on a scholarship deal, and signed his first three-year professional contract with the club at the age of 17 in September 2020. He played on loan at Worcester City, Tuffley Rovers, Evesham United and Bromsgrove Sporting. He made his EFL League One debut for Cheltenham on 30 July 2022, in a 3–2 defeat to Peterborough United at Whaddon Road.

On 20 August 2022, he joined National League club Eastleigh on loan for the first half of the 2022–23 season.

Career statistics

References

2002 births
Living people
Footballers from Birmingham, West Midlands
English footballers
Black British sportsmen
Association football forwards
Cheltenham Town F.C. players
Worcester City F.C. players
Tuffley Rovers F.C. players
Evesham United F.C. players
Bromsgrove Sporting F.C. players
Eastleigh F.C. players
Bath City F.C. players
Southern Football League players
English Football League players
National League (English football) players